Heliozela lithargyrellum is a moth of the Heliozelidae family. It is found in France, Italy and on Corsica and Sicily.

References

Moths described in 1850
Heliozelidae
Moths of Europe